The 8th Vermont Infantry Regiment was a three-year infantry regiment in the Union Army during the American Civil War. It served in both major theaters, first in Louisiana and then in Virginia, from February 1862 to June 1865. It was a member of the XIX Corps.

The regiment was mustered into Federal service on February 18, 1862, at Brattleboro, Vermont. It was engaged in, or present at, the Occupation of New Orleans, Raceland, Boutte Station, Bayou des Allemands, the Steamer "Cotton," Bisland, and Port Hudson, in the Department of the Gulf, and Opequon, Fisher's Hill, Cedar Creek, and Newtown in the Shenandoah Valley campaign.

A notable member of this regiment is Captain Squire E. Howard, a recipient of the Medal of Honor.

New Orleans
After the Union captured New Orleans, it enlisted a number of German-Americans who had been Louisiana citizens. In October 1862, 130 men from the 8th were captured along with seven German-Americans. The Confederates determined that these Germans had been enlisted in the Confederate Army and were therefore traitors. They were forced to dig their own graves, then were shot. The remainder of the prisoners were well-treated and eventually paroled.

Port Hudson
It moved with the XIX Corps to take Port Hudson, Louisiana, in April 1863. In the battle which followed on May 27, it lost 12 men, including the brigade commander, and had 76 wounded.

Battle of Cedar Creek 
During the Battle of Cedar Creek, the 8th Vermont Infantry played a critical role in the fighting. In the early morning fog of 19 October 1864, confederates crossed Cedar Creek near Strasburg, Virginia, and attacked Union forces in their camps.  After routing the Union's VIII Corps, the Confederate attack struck at the XIX Corps.  While the XIX Corps fought back from entrenched position, a second Confederate Corps joined the battle flanking their trenches.  In order to escape the trap Brigadier General William H. Emory, commander of the XIX Corps, ordered the 2nd Brigade of his First Division to move forward, engage, and delay the two Confederate Corps.

At the time of the battle, the 2nd Brigade was composed of four under-strength units, the 47th Pennsylvania Infantry Regiment, the 12th Connecticut Infantry, the 160th New York Infantry, and the 8th Vermont Infantry. The brigade was commanded by Colonel Stephen Thomas, who had previously commanded the 8th Vermont.  As ordered, the brigade advanced several hundred yards beyond the Federal lines and engaged the vastly superior Confederate forces in brutal hand-to-hand combat.  Their stubborn fight held up the Confederate attack for thirty minutes, allowing the rest of the XIX Corps to withdraw and join forces with the VI Corps about a mile to their rear near Belle Grove Plantation.  The 47th Pennsylvania Infantry, on the Brigade's extreme right flank, was almost immediately overrun, hindered by a dense fog and Union 8th Corps men fleeing through its line.  They were pinned down in a ravine and systematically decimated as their black knapsacks stood out in the swirling fog.  As mounting casualties reduced the 2nd Brigade's combat effectiveness, Col. Thomas successfully withdrew his brigade, the 8th Vermont Infantry being the last unit to withdraw.

In this short engagement, the casualty rates were extremely high in all of the 2nd Brigade units, especially the 8th Vermont.  Of 164 Vermont men, 110 were killed or wounded along with 13 of their 16 officers.  The fight was described by one Vermont veteran:

Suddenly a mass of rebels confronted the flags, and with hoarse shouts demanded their surrender.  Defiant shouts went back.  “Never!”  “Never!”  A rebel soldier then leveled his musket and shot Corporal Petre, who held the colors.  He cried out:  “Boys, leave me; take care of yourselves and the flag!”  But in that vortex of hell men did not forget the colors; and as Petrie fell and crawled away to die, they were instantly seized and borne aloft by Corporal Perham, and were as quickly demanded again by a rebel who eagerly attempted to grasp them; but Sergeant Shores of the guard placed his musket at the man's breast and fired, instantly killing him.  But now another flash, and a cruel bullet from the dead rebel's companion killed Corporal Perham, and the colors fell to the earth. Once more, amide terrific yells, the colors went up, this time held by Corporal Blanchard—and the carnage went on.  (George H. Carpenter, 8th Vermont)

Despite the heavy fighting and the loss of three color bearers, the 8th Vermont Infantry did not give up their flag and withdrew in good order.  Falling back slowly, they rejoin the rest of the XIX Corps around Belle Grove plantation.  The 8th Vermont continued to fight all day, ultimately helping to turn the dawn route at Cedar Creek into a major Union victory.

In 1883, a monument of Vermont marble was placed at the site where the 8th Vermont made their stand.  The monument was paid for by Herbert E. Hill, a Vermont businessman who wanted to honor his state's Civil War heroes.  The monument is located in its original place on the battlefield about 150 yards east of the Valley Pike, now U.S. Route 11 between Middletown and Strasburg, Virginia. The monument was well maintained under recent private ownership. In 2012, the property was acquired by Cedar Creek and Belle Grove National Historical Park, which provides visitor access, though currently only through ranger-led programs.

On October 19, 2014 a Vermont Roadside Historic Site Marker commemorating the Vermont soldiers who took part in the battle, including the 8th Vermont Regiment, was unveiled on US Route 11 in Middletown. The marker was put up on the edge of the Cedar Creek Battlefield and is the only Vermont Roadside Historic Site Marker outside the State of Vermont.

Casualties 

Cedar Creek was the last active engagement in which the 8th Vermont Infantry Regiment participated.  During the course of the war a total of 1,772 men served in the 8th Vermont Infantry.  Of that number, the unit lost during its term of service: 104 men killed and mortally wounded, 8 died from accident, 20 died in Confederate prisons, and 213 died from disease; for a total loss of 345 men.

The regiment mustered out of service on June 28, 1865.

Notable members
John L. Barstow, later governor, served in the 8th Vermont
Henry W. Downs, Medal of Honor recipient
William H. Gilmore, regimental quartermaster sergeant, served as Adjutant General of the Vermont National Guard.
Henry Moses Pollard, Congressman from Missouri, was a veteran of the 8th Vermont.
Captain Samuel Walker Shattuck, mathematician
Stephen Thomas, Medal of Honor recipient and later lieutenant governor, commanded the regiment as a colonel.

References

External links 
Vermont in the Civil War
Vermont National Guard Library and Museum

Units and formations of the Union Army from Vermont
Military units and formations established in 1862
Military units and formations disestablished in 1865
1862 establishments in Vermont